Anna Barbara Miros (née Podolec) (born 30 October 1985) is a Polish volleyball player. She plays for MKS Dąbrowa Górnicza in Poland and is also a member of Poland women's national volleyball team. She won the European Champion in 2003 with the latter.

Career
In 2012, she moved to Atom Trefl Sopot. With Poland, she took part in the first edition of the European Games, beating Serbia in the tournament's semifinal and qualified to the final match. On 27 June 2015, Poland was beaten by Turkey in the final, becoming the tournament silver medalists.

Clubs

  MKS Łańcut
  SMS PZPS Sosnowiec
  BKS Stal Bielsko-Biała (2003–2007)
  Proton Balakovo (2007–2008)
  Asystel Novara (2008–2010)
  BKS Stal Bielsko-Biała (2010–2011)
  CS Dinamo București (2011–2012)
  Avtodor-Metar (2012–2012)
  Atom Trefl Sopot (2012–2016)
  MKS Dąbrowa Górnicza (2016–present)

Sporting achievements

National team
 2001  CEV U18 European Championship
 2001  FIVB U18 World Championship
 2002  CEV U20 European Championship
 2003  FIVB U20 World Championship
 2003  CEV European Championship
 2015  European Games

References

External links
 Profile at FIVB
 Profile at CEV
 Player profile  at Orlen Liga

1985 births
Living people
People from Łańcut
Sportspeople from Podkarpackie Voivodeship
Polish women's volleyball players
Olympic volleyball players of Poland
Volleyball players at the 2008 Summer Olympics
Volleyball players at the 2015 European Games
European Games medalists in volleyball
European Games silver medalists for Poland
21st-century Polish women